Robert Francis Duckworth (born 25 August 1929) is a former international speedway rider from New Zealand.

Speedway career 
Duckworth began riding speedway at Tahuna Park in Dunedin in 1949. He moved to England in 1951 and joined the Belle Vue Aces, but only made four appearances in his first two seasons with the team.
In 1953 he rode for the St Austell Gulls in the Southern League. The following year he rejoined Belle Vue in the top tier of British Speedway. The Belle Vue promoter Johnnie Hoskins paid £2.10s for
his transfer from St Austell, and gave him the nickname of ‘Fifty Bob’ Duckworth. During his second spell with Belle Vue he progressed to become one of the team's heat leaders. In 1961 he finished in the top ten averages of UK speedway in the Speedway National League despite being injured in early August and unable to ride for the rest of the season. He resumed riding for Belle Vue in June 1962 but was unable to regain his previous form. In 1963 he rode for the Newcastle Diamonds in the Provincial League. The following year he returned to New Zealand where he continued to ride until the early 1970s at Western Springs Stadium. In 1964 he finished third equal on points in the New Zealand Speedway Championship but lost the runoff for third place to Bob Andrews.

Duckworth represented his country New Zealand in the 1960 Speedway World Team Cup and 1961 Speedway World Team Cup. 

He competed in the Championship Round of the Speedway World Championship in 1955 and 1956 and the British/Commonwealth Round in 1958. In 1961 he qualified for the British semi-final of the World Championship but was injured during the meeting at Southampton in August and had to withdraw.

References 

Living people
1929 births
New Zealand speedway riders
Belle Vue Aces riders
Newcastle Diamonds riders